Seattle Central College is a public college in Seattle, Washington. With North Seattle College and South Seattle College, it is one of the three colleges that comprise the Seattle Colleges District. The college has a substantial international student population served by the International Education Programs division as well as many immigrant and refugee students taking ESL courses through the Basic and Transitional Studies division. Seattle Central College also encompasses the Wood Construction Center and Seattle Maritime Academy, which are on separate campuses to house the very specific tools and workspaces needed.

History

Seattle Central's origins can be traced to 1902, with the opening of Broadway High School. It operated as a traditional high school until the end of World War II, when it was converted to a vocational and adult education institution for the benefit of veterans who wanted to finish high school. As a result, in 1946, its high school students were all transferred to Lincoln High School, and the Edison Technical School (which already shared a campus with Broadway High) was expanded to fill the entire facility.

Edison started offering college-level courses when it was reconstituted as Seattle Community College in September 1966. North Seattle Community College and South Seattle Community College opened their doors in 1970, whereupon Seattle Community College was renamed Seattle Central Community College.

In March 2014, the Seattle Community Colleges District Board of Trustees voted unanimously to change the name of the District to Seattle Colleges and to change the names of the colleges to Seattle Central College, North Seattle College and South Seattle College. The decision followed similar decisions by nine other Washington state community colleges that had recently started to offer baccalaureate degrees.

Campus

Seattle Central College is an urban campus on Seattle's Capitol Hill, located along its main thoroughfare, Broadway, and west of Cal Anderson Park. The college occupies 10 buildings. Its main structure is the five-story Broadway-Edison Building, which stands south of the four-story Science and Math Building. West of the Broadway-Edison building stand the four-story Mitchell Activity Center, a bookstore, and on-campus apartments for international students; south stand the three-story Broadway Performance Hall, the South Plaza, and the five-story Fine Arts Building. Other structures in the southern part of the campus include a three-story South Annex, Erickson Theater, and Siegal Center (the Seattle Colleges District headquarters). There is also a four-story parking garage just west of the Broadway Performance Hall.

Academics and programs

Academic degrees 
Seattle Central College offers two accredited bachelor's degree programs, a Bachelor of Applied Science in Applied Behavioral Science, and a Bachelor of Applied Science in Allied Health. The applied nature of the degrees places increased emphasis on teaching practical skills, versus theory. In addition, two-year associate's degrees are offered that comply with Washington's Direct Transfer Agreement (DTA). The DTA guarantees that all credits taken will be accepted for transfer to any state university in Washington for completion of a bachelor's degree at that institution for persons wanting to pursue a B.A. or B.S. outside of Seattle Central.

Basic studies
Seattle Central's Basic Studies Division offers ESL training to non-native speakers to achieve English proficiency, as well as a GED preparation and testing program.

Vocational training
Seattle Central College's Seattle Maritime Academy provides students aspiring to enter the U.S. Merchant Marine with STCW training, through two different programs, each requiring about one year to complete. The Marine Deck Technology program teaches skills designed to prepare students to qualify for an Able Seaman–Special rating, while the Marine Engineering Technology program prepares students to qualify as a marine electrician or junior engineer. Both programs culminate in a 60-day at-sea internship aboard a large commercial ship. The academy operates its own 82-foot vessel, Maritime Instructor (formerly USCGC Point Divide), for instructional purposes.

The college's Seattle Culinary Academy offers a five quarter certificate program in Specialty Desserts and Breads, and a six quarter certificate program in Culinary Arts. Both are accredited by the American Culinary Federation.

Seattle Central's Wood Technology Center offers three certificate programs (carpentry, cabinet making, and marine carpentry) ranging in length from four to six quarters.

Other vocational training offered by Seattle Central includes information technology and graphic design programs. A two-year Associate of Science in Nursing is offered to prepare students to become registered nurses.

Student life

Mitchell Activity Center
The Mitchell Activity Center is an 85,000 square foot athletic facility constructed in 1996. It includes racquetball and squash courts, gymnasiums, a strength training facility, and a game room, and is accessible to full-time students for an annual membership fee of $92, and to faculty and staff for a fee of $60. Persons not affiliated with the college can purchase an annual membership for $540.

Student publications
The City Collegian was Seattle Central College's award-winning biweekly student newspaper, published continuously from 1966 until 2008. In that year, college administrators shut it down and cancelled journalism classes after controversial articles by student journalists embarrassed the administrators, prompted student protests, and incurred administrative hostility toward the journalists and their publication. The paper's faculty adviser, Jeb Wyman, resigned to protest administrative actions. The City Collegian returned to print as New City Collegian on June 5, 2012. Written by Seattle Central students, the publication was sponsored by a local business, Cupcake Royale, and received no funding from the college. It has since ceased publication. A magazine, The Central Circuit, was established in 2011 and published several times a year. It was the only student publication funded by the college until it suspended publication in 2016 due to the lack of an advisor.

Since 2018, Seattle Central College's newspaper has continued in the form of The Seattle Collegian.

Notable alumni and faculty

Alumni
 Bruce Lee - martial artist and Hollywood action film star
 Duff McKagan - bassist with Guns N' Roses
 Dean Fujioka - Japanese actor, musician, model, director, artist, and radio host
 Macklemore (took Running Start classes as a high school student) - musician
 Tay Zonday - singer, actor, musician, voice talent
 DeCharlene Williams - business owner and activist

Faculty and staff
 Constance Rice (former) - University of Washington Board of Regents member, wife of former Seattle mayor Norm Rice
 Kshama Sawant (former) - Seattle City Council member

References

External links 

 Official website

Community colleges in Washington (state)
Universities and colleges in Seattle
Educational institutions established in 1902
Universities and colleges accredited by the Northwest Commission on Colleges and Universities
Capitol Hill, Seattle
1902 establishments in Washington (state)